Bibala  (known as Vila Arriaga until 1975) is a town, with a population of 10,500 (2014), and a municipality in southern Angola. It lies in Namibe Province.

It is bordered to the north by the municipality of Camucuio, to the east by Quilengues, Cacula, Lubango and Humpata, to the south by Virei, and to the west by Namibe. It is composed of the communes of Bibala-Sede, Caitou, Lola e Kapagombe.

History
The village developed under Portuguese colonial administration with the arrival of the Namibe Train on February 1, 1912. The village's original name was Vila Arriaga, after the Portuguese President Manuel José de Arriaga (1841-1917). Residential houses for the workers of the Mozambique Railroad were built here, and from then on the settling families continued to farm and breed cattle. Vila Arriaga became its own municipality on June 21, 1918. With the elevation to a small town (Vila) on December 13, 1965, Vila Arriaga became the seat of its own district. After Angola's independence in 1975, the Portuguese place name Vila Arriaga was replaced with the current name, Bibala.

Transport 

It is served by a station on the southern network of Angolan Railways.

See also 

 Railway stations in Angola
 Transport in Angola

References 

Populated places in Namibe Province
Municipalities of Angola